Šimenc is a surname. Notable people with the surname include: 

Dubravko Šimenc (born 1966), Croatian water polo player and coach
Laura Šimenc (born 1990), Slovenian racing cyclist
Miha Šimenc (born 1995), Slovenian skier
Zlatko Šimenc (born 1938), Croatian water polo player and coach

Slovene-language surnames
Croatian surnames